Pyaar Mein Kabhi Kabhi is a 1999 Indian Hindi language musical romance film directed by Raj Kaushal. The film starred debutants Rinke Khanna, Dino Morea and Sanjay Suri. The film is set against the backdrop of a Performing Arts College. The film was written by Shailendra Singh and the first release of his production house, Percept Picture Company. The film debut of 300 members of cast and crew. The film was unsuccessful at the box office but the soundtrack of the film became chart buster with music by debuting Vishal Dadlani and Shekhar Ravjiani.

Plot 
The film revolves around a group of talented friends, whose lives undergo a complete change with the arrival of a new student – Khushi. The friends are Siddhant, Bhargav or Bugs, Ronnie, Radha, Ruby, Manoj Dhanwani as ‘Haklu’ because he stammers a lot. They all are the young and vibrant students of National Institute of Performing Arts. Khushi brings a lot of happiness in their lives and as the days pass by, both Sid and Bugs fall in love with her. But Khushi loves Sid. Sid is driven by a burning ambition of becoming a singer. He throws friendship aside for a desirable woman (Roxy), who he believes, is his stepping stone to success.

He dreams of becoming the greatest pop singer and performing with Roxy. But nothing stops them (Sid and Khushi) from coming closer and closer each day. Bugs finds himself falling deeply in love with Khushi, but is forced to keep it a secret that only he can treasure. He takes Khushi on a day-long romantic date. Khushi, broken by Sid's falling for another woman, returns to her comfortable yet lonely existence, the very home that she left to find genuine love and lasting friendships. Emotional upheavals also haunt the rest of the group when a close colleague develops AIDS.

Cast 
 Dino Morea  as Siddhant
 Rinke Khanna as Khushi
 Sanjay Suri as Baksh Bhargav/Bugs
 Shweta Salve as Radha
 Akashdeep Saigal as Ronnie
 Mohan Kapoor
 Akash Karnataki as KS
 Melody Decunha as Ruby
 Manoj Dhanwani as Hari/Haklu
 Tora Khasgir as Roxy
 Tarun Arora

Soundtrack 
The song 'Musu Musu Haasi Deu' by The Himalayans band was reused in this film. Bollywood classical singer and composer Manas Mukherjee's son and Bollywood pop singer Sagarika's brother Shaan also debuted as singer with this movie.

Reception 
Vasanthi Hariprakash of The New Indian Express opined that "The director deals with no issue in full, whether it is the trauma of an AIDS-afflicted person or the hopes of a wannabe, leaving the audience absolutely unmoved. The songs, especially the chart-buster Musu Musu, are highly hummable, but they don’t really gel with the movie". Sharmila Taliculam of Rediff.com wrote ″Pyar Mein Kabhi Kabhi may have had something to it if it had a story, a strong script, and not just dabbled in sentimental tripe. But it still has tried to maintain a youthful feel throughout. But while the cast is on a feel good trip, the audience slowly stops smiling and look forward to the arrival of some maturity.″

Awards 
 Zee Cine Award – Best Female Debut – Rinkie Khanna

References

External links 
 

1990s Hindi-language films
1990s buddy comedy films
1990s romantic musical films
1990s romantic comedy-drama films
1999 films
Films scored by Vishal–Shekhar
Indian buddy comedy films
Sony Pictures films
Columbia Pictures films
Sony Pictures Networks India films
1990s musical comedy-drama films
Indian romantic comedy-drama films
Indian musical comedy-drama films
1999 comedy films
1999 drama films